Fox Life India is a Indian pay television Channel owned by The Walt Disney Company India. a wholly owned by The Walt Disney Company. the channel was previously known as Fox History & Entertainment and was renamed FOX History & Traveller in May 2011 further as Fox Traveller in October 2011 and further renamed Fox Life on 15 June 2014. It is the only Fox-branded channel within the Disney Star network.

Fox life is aimed at viewers in India and other south Asian countries including Nepal, Bhutan, Bangladesh, Pakistan and Sri Lanka. The channel recently increased its travel based content. The channel aims to present a perspective of the world through the eyes of Indians and undertakes locally produced content. It is available in four languages - English, Hindi, Tamil and Bengali. The channel can be viewed on digital cable and satellite television in India.

Unlike Other Localized Feed, FOX Life Focus More Lifestyle Programme similar like Nat Geo People, Some Drama and Variety Show on Localized Feed Star World.

History 
Fox life (erstwhile known as Fox History & Entertainment) is owned by FIC which also operates and distributes many other channels in India including FX, Fox Crime and BabyTV.

Fox life experimented with a dedicated Traveller Band (weeknights, from 9 to 10 pm) in January 2011, which received  a good response from the viewers, both in terms of the ratings and qualitative response. The first local Indian production of 2011 was a show that explored the psyche of Indian men across the country through the eyes of two sassy, urban women – Sugandha Garg and Indrani Dasgupta. The show ‘What’s With Indian Men’, was high on entertainment, wit and exploration of both - the geography and the gender.

On 15 June 2014, Fox Traveller was replaced by India feed of Fox Life, which runs in other countries.

"This Journey is Fun" 

The channel follows a new brand philosophy of ‘This journey is fun’ as their shows focus on the journey rather than the destinations. The channel looks at accentuating the travel, unlike regular travel shows that concentrate on destinations, the shows on Fox Traveller focus on the fun element attached to travel, the experiences and the people. The audiences includes people who are hungry for new, bigger, better, and varied experiences; open to experimenting; open to trying out even challenging things and wanting to visit the places and ideas that they see on the channel.

Popular shows related to India 

Life Mein Ek Baar
‘Life Mein Ek Baar’ is an adventurous journey of four friends, including actor and VJ Purab Kohli. Launched on 6 November 2011, the program showcases the adventure undertaken by a gang of boys chasing their travel wish list, thrilling escapades and heart-warming journeys continue, causing some serious adrenaline rush.

Twist of Taste with Vikas Khanna
Michelin Star Chef Vikas Khanna travelled to 13 Indians cities and added his signature touch to the local flavours, transforming them into exotic sought-after dishes, fit for both the Indian and International taste buds on ‘Twist of Taste with Vikas Khanna’. The show premiered on 20 January 2014.

What's With Indian Men?
Indrani Dasgupta and spunky actress, Sugandha Garg attempt to decipher Indian men while undertaking a journey across the length and breadth of India in, ‘What’s With Indian Men?’. The show premiered on 4 June 2011, and was aired every Saturday night at 10. Sugandha and Indrani travelled to 10 different Indian cities including Delhi, Mumbai, Kolkata, Chennai, Hyderabad, Guwahati, Ahmedabad, Goa etc. to understand what makes Indian men tick.

Programming
All the programmes are currently telecasting in English, Hindi, Tamil and Bengali language in India.

 Ariana's Iran
 Styled by June
 Kitchen Nightmares
 Miguel's Tropical Kitchen
 This is Brazil!
 David Rocco's Dolce India
 Food Safari
 MasterChef (UK TV series)
 Getaway
 Eat St.
 Latin Angels
 Best of the Best (TV Series)
 Jamie's Great Britain
 From Spain with Love with Annie Sibonney
 When Patrick Met Kylie
 Sound Trek
 Project Runway
 The Janice Dickinson Modeling Agency
 Clifton Shores
 5 Ingredient Fix
 My Sri Lanka with Peter Kuruvita
 David Rocco's Dolce Vita
 David Rocco's Amalfi Getaway
 Italian Food Safari
 Sugar Stars
 French Food Safari
 Street Food Around the World
 Food Safari Asia
 BYOB (Be Your Own Boss)

References

Logos 
Fox Life changed logos continuously, from November 2008 to the present, Fox Traveller has changed its logo five times, and initially it was Fox History and Entertainment. Then it became Fox History and Traveller because there were no Entertainment serials and there were a lot of history serials. Then it changed into a different logo which was Fox History and Traveller. This was the third logo. Now it became Fox Traveller since there were no History serials and there were only travel and sightseeing serials. And on 15 June 2014 it changed itself to Fox Life and it now presents not only cooking, travel, sightseeing but also entertainment and History.

External links

Television stations in India
English-language television stations in India
Television channels and stations established in 2008
India
Disney Star